Seven – The Ashvamedha Prophecy is an Indian supernatural television series that aired on Sony Entertainment Television  from 1 January 2010 to 25 June 2010. The series was produced by Aditya Chopra, and stars Rakesh Bapat and Shama Sikander.

Plot 
When the "Saptarshi" constellation falls in place, Dr. Charak, an astronomer, scientist, and philosopher knows the time has come for him to find the descendants of the saptarishi or seven sages.

‘Seven’, is the story of the search for the seven descendants and their journey of discovering their real capabilities. Asmin, Hriday, Varya, Haryaksh, Mastishk, Eklavya, and Drishika, have what it takes to save the world. The unique powers they possess are complemented with their different mindsets, learning and outlook in life. Dr Charak, the guru, must bring seven such distinct personalities under one roof and fulfil the Ashwamedha prophecy – a secret that will give great power to the person who unravels it, before Asht, the master of evil and Dr. Charak's rival, decodes it.

Seven ordinary people with extraordinary powers come together to unravel new mythological mysteries until the Ashvamedha, whose secret will change the fate of the Seven. In the final episode they reach the place where they find deadly weapons (comparable to modern day nuclear weapons) which brings the final climax of Ashvamedha. Asht tries to win over Saptarshi but fails and unleashes his daughter Shunya (unaware that she is his daughter) to fight the Seven. Asht gains the upper hand and tries to kill Varya but Shunya intervenes and dies saving Varya but after revealing the truth that she is Asht's daughter. Finally, Asht is defeated. Shlok deletes the collective memory of everyone and the Seven carry on with their lives as normal people.

To know the secret of the Ashvamedha prophecy, the Seven have to collect nine ancient books which are at nine different places. Each book teaches them new abilities and unravels new mysteries. The books are very precious and the holders of these books first put the Seven through a test to assess their abilities. The books are given to nine different people for safekeeping until the "Saptrishis" come to collect them. Each book teaches the Seven new abilities, like "the touch of death" and "communication with nature". In his bid to stop the Seven, Asht kills all the nine guardians of the books once they have performed their duty of passing on the books to the Seven.

The Books teach the nine new abilities and powers:
 1st book – Touch of death (Ability learnt by Asmin)
 2nd book – Communicating with plants (Ability learnt by Mastishk)
 3rd book – Controlling light (Ability learnt by Haryaksh)
 4th book – Teleporting (Ability learnt by All)
 5th book – Medicinal powers of healing (Ability learnt by Hriday)
 6th book – Looking into time in any direction (Ability learnt by Drishika)
 7th book – Time travel (Ability learnt by Eklavya and Varya)
 8th book – Anti gravity (Ability learnt by Hriday)
 9th book – The collection of these powers in one person (Ability successfully performed by Varya)

Cast 
 Raqesh Vashisth as Shlok 
 Shama Sikander as Shunya
 Shireen Farooq as Asmin Bharadwaj
 Nushrat Bharucha as Drishika Kashyap 
 Shivam Sood as Eklavya Gautam
 Himmanshoo A. Malhotra as Haryaksh Vashisht
 Raashul Tandon as Hriday Atri
 Meherzan Mazda as Mastishk Kashyap
 Kashmira Irani as Varya Vishwamitra
 Naveen Melandro Kaushik as Asht Arya, antagonist
 Anubhav Krishna Srivastava as Daksh Rajvansh
 Sunny Hinduja as Shiven
 Riddhi Dogra as Diya
 Arish Bhiwandiwala as Shikher
 Puru Chibber as Adhirath
 Bakul Thakkar as Mahesh Kashyap
 Seema Azmi as Radhika
 Krishna Chaudhary as Rana
 Arun Bali as Mahaguru
 Aarun Nagar as the Boat Man

References

External links 
 Seven Official Site on Sony TV India
 Official Blog

Sony Entertainment Television original programming
Indian fantasy television series
2010 Indian television series debuts
2010 Indian television series endings
Indian mythology in popular culture
Hindu mythology in popular culture